The  is a river that flows through the eastern part of Hiroshima Prefecture, Japan. The river provides the primary drainage for the Bingo region.

The source of the river is in the city of Mihara, Hiroshima and flows generally east toward Niimi, Okayama. After flowing through the Hattabara and Mikawa Dams in Fuchū, Hiroshima, the river passes through Fukuyama, Hiroshima, where it empties into the Seto Inland Sea.

Rivers of Hiroshima Prefecture
Rivers of Japan